Clinton "C. J." Jones (born September 20, 1980) is a former American football wide receiver. He was signed by the Cleveland Browns as an undrafted free agent in 2003. He played college football at Iowa.

Jones has also been a member of the Seattle Seahawks, New England Patriots, Kansas City Chiefs, and Denver Broncos.

College career
Jones attended college at Iowa where he majored in sports studies.

Jones transferred to Iowa from Garden City Community College (1999–2000), where he recorded 74 receptions for 1,463 yards and 18 touchdowns.  He also scored eight touchdowns on punt returns.  As a sophomore, he was selected to the Elite 16 Junior College All-America squad.  In his freshman season, he earned first-team All-American honors as a return specialist.

During his two years at Iowa, Jones recorded 72 catches for 902 yards and 10 scores.  He caught 9 touchdown passes in Iowa's 2002 BCS season that saw his quarterback, Brad Banks, get Heisman Runner-up.  The Hawkeyes played USC in the Orange Bowl and Jones returned the opening kickoff for a touchdown.

Professional career

Seattle Seahawks
Before the 2006 season, Jones was also a member of the Seattle Seahawks but was released.

New England Patriots
In 2007, he signed with the Patriots and was on the practice squad for the whole season. In 2008, he made the team's final cut but was released after the Patriots signed wide receiver Maurice Price.

Kansas City Chiefs
Jones was signed by the Kansas City Chiefs on March 5, 2009. He was waived on June 19, 2009.

Denver Broncos
Jones was claimed off waivers by the Denver Broncos on June 24, 2009.  He was released on September 1.

Personal life
His younger brother, Corey Jones, 31, was shot and killed by a Palm Beach Gardens police officer on October 18, 2015.

Jones is a cousin of Vince Wilfork, a former defensive lineman for the Houston Texans and New England Patriots.

Jones is a cousin of Anquan Boldin, a wide receiver for the San Francisco 49ers.
He went to Santaluces Community High School in Lantana, Florida.

External links

Just Sports Stats
Iowa Hawkeyes bio
Kansas City Chiefs bio
New England Patriots bio

1980 births
Living people
Players of American football from Florida
American football wide receivers
American football return specialists
Canadian football wide receivers
African-American players of American football
African-American players of Canadian football
Iowa Hawkeyes football players
Montreal Alouettes players
Cleveland Browns players
Cologne Centurions (NFL Europe) players
Seattle Seahawks players
Berlin Thunder players
New England Patriots players
Kansas City Chiefs players
Denver Broncos players
Florida Tuskers players
21st-century African-American sportspeople
20th-century African-American people